Bekkefaret Church is a parish church of the Church of Norway in Stavanger Municipality in Rogaland county, Norway. It is located in the Bekkefaret neighborhood in the borough of Hillevåg in the city of Stavanger. It is the church for the Bekkefaret parish which is part of the Stavanger domprosti (arch-deanery) in the Diocese of Stavanger. The red brick church was built in a semi-circular design in 1977 using designs by the architects Per Amund Riseng and Jan Stensrud. The church seats about 550 people.

See also
List of churches in Rogaland

References

Churches in Stavanger
Brick churches in Norway
20th-century Church of Norway church buildings
Churches completed in 1977
1977 establishments in Norway